Fung Wang-yuen (22 September 1942 – 4 February 2014), better known by his stage name Wu Ma, was a Hong Kong actor, director, producer and writer. Wu Ma made his screen debut in 1963, and with over 240 appearances to his name (plus 49 directorial credits within a fifty-year period), he was one of the most familiar faces in the history of Hong Kong Cinema and is best known as the Taoist ghosthunter in A Chinese Ghost Story.

Early years
Born Feng Hongyuan in Tianjin, Republic of China. At 16 he moved to Guangzhou and became a machinist before migrating to Hong Kong in 1960. In 1962, Feng enrolled in the Shaw Brothers acting course. Graduating a year later, he became a contract player for the studio and made his first appearance in Lady General Hua Mu-lan. He then appeared in such films as Temple of the Red Lotus (1965), The Knight of Knights (1966) and Trail of the Broken Blade (1967). He took on the stage name 'Wu Ma' as it reflected the animal in the year of his birth (the horse), and believed it was short enough for audiences to remember. 

During an interview, Wu explained that he had stumbled upon directing when he was offered an unexpected trip to Japan for a movie. The film's original assistant director was unable to clear his visa in time, and Wu was called upon to take his place. After the experience, Wu decided to become a director.

Career

1970s
In 1970, Wu became a director in his own right. His directorial debut, Wrath of the Sword, was released the same year. In 1971, Wu released one of his seminal works, The Deaf and Mute Heroine. He concentrated on directing in the 1970s, directing several movies – such as Young Tiger (1973) and Wits to Wits (1974). Wits to Wits has been noted as one of the precursors of the knockabout comedy kung fu genre that was later made famous by Sammo Hung and Jackie Chan. Another movie Wu directed, Manchu Boxer (1974), featured Sammo Hung, then a young choreographer and later one of the trend-setters of Hong Kong cinema. This marked the beginning of a strong working relationship between the two, which would become prominent towards the 1980s. He co-directed with his former mentor Chang in several movies – The Water Margin (1972), The Pirate (1973), All Men Are Brothers (1975) and The Naval Commandos (1976).

While most of his output during this period was as a director, Wu continued to appear as an actor and appeared both in his own movies and in several others, although his roles were generally limited to small appearances. During the mid-1970s, Wu joined a small exodus who were leaving Shaw Brothers due to corruption within the studio and became an independent director. Despite becoming an independent director, Wu was still able to work closely with some Shaw Brothers stars such as Ti Lung (The Massive (1978)).

1980s
As the 1970s and the era of the martial arts film mania slowed down albeit very slightly, Wu Ma's output as a director also slowed. His acting output, however, increased as he became increasingly well known as a popular character actor. Wu had made appearances in Sammo Hung's 1970s movies (such as The Iron-Fisted Monk), his association with Hung began in earnest in the early 1980s. Wu appeared in Encounters of the Spooky Kind (1980). Throughout the 1980s, Wu and Hung had a close working relationship, often with Wu as the director and Hung as the producer (such as My Cousin The Ghost (1986)). Wu worked in Hung's production company Bo Ho as the production manager, and made appearances in Hung-directed films during the 1980s, including Millionaire's Express (1986) and Wheels on Meals (1984).

Towards the mid-1980s, Wu became one of the most prolific character actors in Hong Kong, his now-rubbery face able to shift effortlessly across a spectrum of emotions. During the 1980s, he received three Hong Kong Film Award nominations for Best Supporting Actor – for Righting Wrongs (1986), where he played a policeman having to deal with his son's death; the classic A Chinese Ghost Story (1987) as Yin Chek-Ha, which is considered one of the greatest films ever made; and in The Last Eunuch in China (1988), as Lord Ting. He began a working relationship with Tsui Hark, and appeared in several of Hark's movies. Aside from A Chinese Ghost Story, Wu also appeared in the earlier classic Peking Opera Blues (1986). 

After A Chinese Ghost Story, said by Wu to be among his most favorite movies, Wu began to focus on the supernatural genre. Much of his directorial efforts after 1987 were within that genre, such as Picture of a Nymph look alike mini sequel from Chinese Ghost Story directed by Eric Tsang   (1988), Burning Sensation (1989) and Fox Legend (1991). He also co-directed Just Heroes (1989) with John Woo.

1990s
Wu continued his working relationship with Hark, and appeared in Once Upon A Time in China (1991) and The Swordsman (1991). The early 1990s were an especially prolific period in Wu's career – with Wu appearing in over 14 movies during one year. As the Hong Kong film industry began to slump, Wu's career also slowed considerably. After appearing in High Risk (1995), many of his appearances were either in low-budget movies or in television series.

Personal life
Wu Ma had a relationship with actress Agassi Wang (王玉環) from the mid-1980s to early 1990s.

In 1995, Wu went to Shenzhen to film and met a real estate agent Ma Yan (馬艷), who was 23 years younger than him. After their marriage, she became his agent. They have one daughter.

Death
Wu was diagnosed with lung cancer and it was announced that the disease started to spread ten months ago. His wife stated that "He had enjoyed every precious minute with his family, which explained that he had casually walked his path with pride and dignity." He died peacefully at his home in Hong Kong on 4 February 2014 at the age of 71.

Filmography

Films

Television

See also
Chang Cheh
Sammo Hung
Lam Ching-ying

References

External links
A short biography and filmography
A detailed biography – bottom of page

A Chinese Ghost Story – commentary by Bey Logan
Interview in Chinese

1942 births
2014 deaths
20th-century Chinese male actors
21st-century Chinese male actors
20th-century Hong Kong male actors
21st-century Hong Kong male actors
Chinese male film actors
Chinese male television actors
Chinese film directors
Deaths from cancer in Hong Kong
Deaths from lung cancer
Film directors from Tianjin
Hong Kong male film actors
Hong Kong film directors
Hong Kong male television actors
Male actors from Tianjin